Tansa is a commune in Iași County, Western Moldavia, Romania. It is composed of two villages, Suhuleț and Tansa.

Natives
 Gheorghe Macovei

References

Communes in Iași County
Localities in Western Moldavia